The 1995 Patriot League men's basketball tournament was played at Christl Arena in West Point, New York and Cotterell Court in Hamilton, New York after the conclusion of the 1994–95 regular season.  defeated #3 seed , 68–63 in the championship game, to win its first Patriot League Tournament title. The Raiders earned an automatic bid to the 1995 NCAA tournament as #16 seed in the Midwest region.

Format
All eight league members participated in the tournament, with teams seeded according to regular season conference record. Play began with the quarterfinal round.

Bracket

* denotes overtime period

References

Tournament
Patriot League men's basketball tournament
Patriot League men's basketball tournament
Patriot League men's basketball tournament